Tatsuya Uchi (内 竜也, born July 13, 1985 in Kawasaki, Kanagawa) is a Japanese professional baseball pitcher who is currently a free agent. He has played in Nippon Professional Baseball (NPB) for the Chiba Lotte Marines.

Career

On June 15, 2004, Uchi made his NPB debut.

He selected .  On November 4, 2020, Chiba Lotte announced that Uchi's contract would not be renewed for the 2021 season.

On December 2, 2020, he become a free agent.

References

External links

NPB

1979 births
Living people
Baseball people from Kanagawa Prefecture
Chiba Lotte Marines players
Honolulu Sharks players
Japanese expatriate baseball players in the United States
Nippon Professional Baseball pitchers
People from Kawasaki, Kanagawa
North Shore Honu players